The Mangrove forests of Qeshm or Hara forests of Qeshm, are the mangrove forests on the southern coast of Iran, particularly on and near the island of Qeshm in the Persian Gulf. Dominated by the species Avicennia marina, known locally as the "hara" or "harra" tree, the forests represent an important ecological resource. The "Hara Protected Area" on Quesm and the nearby mainland is a biosphere reserve where commercial use is restricted to fishing (mainly shrimp), tourist boat trips, and limited mangrove cutting for animal feed.

Hara tree characteristics 
The hara tree, Avicennia marina, grows to heights of three to eight meters and has bright green leaves and twigs. The tree is a salt-water plant that is often submerged at high tide. It usually blossoms and bears fruit from mid-July to August, with yellow flowers and a sweet almond-like fruit. The seeds fall into the water, where wave action takes them to more stationary parts of the sea. The hara seeds become fixed in the soil layers of the sea and grow. The area on the north shore of Qeshm and the neighboring mainland is particularly suited to the growth of the plant, and large mangrove forests have developed.

The long, narrow, oval leaves of the tree have nutritious value for livestock roughly equivalent to barley and alfalfa. The roots of the tree are knee-form, aerial, sponge-like and usually external. There is a filtration property in the hara tree's bark which allows the plant to absorb sweet water while salt is eliminated.

Forest extent and significance 
The hara forest on Qeshm and the opposite mainland covers an area of approximately 20 km by 20 km, with many tidal channels. The traditional stock breeders of Qeshm Island used the leaves of the hara tree for feeding livestock. In 1972 the Hara Protected Area was established to preserve suitable conditions for the growth and maintenance of the forests.

The area is a major habitat for migratory birds in the cold season, and for reptiles, fish, and varieties of arthropoda and bivalves. Green (or hooked) turtles and venomous aquatic snakes are also indigenous to the forests. Bird life includes herons, flamingos, pelicans, and angler eagles. Another important feature of these forests is the appropriate and suitable seabed conditions for the ovulation of fish in the Persian Gulf.

History 
Centuries ago, Asian elephants (the Indian or Syrian elephant) once lived in the region of Qeshm and other regions of southern Iran.

See also 
 International Network of Geoparks
 List of Geoparks

References

External links 
 
 Events Magazine article on Qeshm Island
 Fotopages.com page on Hara Forest
 Discussion of Hara Forest on Minâb website

Biosphere reserves of Iran
Global Geoparks Network members
Forests of Iran
Geoparks in Iran
Geography of Hormozgan Province